Interstate 24 (I-24) is an Interstate Highway in the Midwestern and Southeastern United States. It travels through Illinois, Kentucky, Tennessee, and Georgia. As an even-numbered Interstate, it is signed as an east–west route, though the route follows a more southeast–northwest routing, passing through Nashville, Tennessee. The numbering deviates from the standard Interstate Highway System grid, lying further north than its number would indicate west of Nashville.

I-24 between Nashville and Chattanooga is part of a longer north–south freight corridor which runs between Chicago and Atlanta. The stretch through Chattanooga also experiences severe congestion, due to an unusually high volume of truck traffic. The stretch of I-24 across the Cumberland Plateau, commonly known as "Monteagle Mountain", is considered one of the most hazardous stretches of highway in the United States, particularly for trucks, due to its steep descents, which measure a maximum of 6% grade.

As proposed by the Federal Aid Highway Act of 1956, the western terminus of I-24 was originally located in Nashville. Most of the route between Nashville and Chattanooga was constructed in the 1960s, with the final section opening in 1971. After extensive lobbying from local politicians, the Bureau of Public Roads, the predecessor agency to the Federal Highway Administration, authorized an extension of I-24 to its present-day western terminus in Pulleys Mill, Illinois, in 1964. As a result, I-24 was the last mainline Interstate Highway in Tennessee and Kentucky to be completed, with the last sections in the two states opening in 1978 and 1980, respectively.

Route description 

|-
|IL
|
|-
|KY
|
|-
|TN
|
|-
|GA
|
|-
|Total
|
|}
I-24 runs diagonally from I-57 south of Marion, Illinois to I-75 at Chattanooga, Tennessee.  In Kentucky, the road passes through Paducah and Eddyville.  Its length in Tennessee is longer than the other three states combined. There are two segments that are separated by the segment in Georgia.  Through Georgia, it carries the unsigned State Route 409 (SR 409) designation for internal Georgia Department of Transportation (GDOT) purposes.

Illinois 
I-24 begins at exit 44 on I-57 in southern Williamson County, near the community of Pulleys Mill. The highway heads southeast into rural Johnson County, bypassing Goreville to the east. It reaches an exit at Tunnel Hill Road, which serves Goreville and Tunnel Hill. The highway continues south to its next exit at U.S. Route 45 (US 45) north of Vienna. It reaches its next exit at Illinois Route 146 (IL 146) in eastern Vienna. I-24 heads southeast from Vienna into Massac County. Its first exit in Massac County is at Big Bay Road, which serves the communities of Big Bay and New Columbia. I-24 continues southward, bypassing the community of Round Knob before entering Metropolis. The highway meets US 45 again in Metropolis and passes west of Fort Massac State Park. It leaves Metropolis and crosses the Interstate 24 Bridge over the Ohio River. After that, it continues into Kentucky.

Kentucky 

I-24 enters the Jackson Purchase region of western Kentucky on a north-south alignment. Immediately within McCracken County, the route begins gradually veering southeast, and enters the western fringes of Paducah a few miles later. The welcome center in Paducah utilizes Whitehaven, the only historic house in the United States used as a rest area. In Paducah, the interstate continues to shift southeast, and has interchanges with US 60, US 62, and US 45. Passing through the Hendron and Farley communities adjacent to Paducah, the highway shifts into a direct east-west alignment several miles later, and has an interchange with US 68 in Reidland. The route then enters Marshall County, and about  later reaches an interchange with I-69 and a connector road to US 62 and Calvert City to the north. Here, it begins a concurrency with the former. The two interstates then shift northeast and have an interchange with US 62 about  later. A short distance later, the interstates cross the Tennessee River onto the Pennyroyal Plateau and Livingston County just north of Kentucky Dam and its Kentucky Lake impoundment. The highways then have an interchange with Route 453 north of Lake City and the Land Between the Lakes National Recreation Area. They then cross the Cumberland River about  later into Lyon County a few miles north of Barkley Dam and Lake Barkley. 

Gradually veering eastward, the two interstates reach US 62 again near Kuttawa and Eddyville. Less than  later, I-69 splits off to the northeast at a trumpet interchange, and I-24 passes through Mineral Mound State Park, veering southeast a few miles later. Passing through a mostly wooded area, the interstate crosses Route 93 without an interchange, and then has an interchange with Route 293 near the Kentucky State Penitentiary. It then crosses an inlet of Lake Barkley a few miles later. Some distance later, the freeway enters a landscape consisting mostly of farmland, and dips briefly into the southern tip of Caldwell County, where it has an interchange with Route 139. The interstate then enters Trigg County, and crosses the Muddy Fork Little River a short distance later. About  later, the interstate has an interchange with US 68 and Route 80 between Cadiz and Hopkinsville. The highway then crosses into Christian County a few miles later. Passing over the next several miles through additional farmland and bypassing Hopkinsville to the southwest, the interstate reaches the southern terminus of I-169 at a trumpet interchange. About  later, the interstate has a partial cloverleaf interchange with US 41 Alternate, which provides access to Hopkinsville to the north and Fort Campbell and Clarksville, Tennessee, to the south. I-24 then crosses into Tennessee about  later.

Tennessee

Clarksville and Western Highland Rim 
I-24 crosses into Tennessee from Kentucky traveling in a southeasterly-to-northwesterly direction into Montgomery County, and serving as a major means of access to St. Louis and Chicago to the northwest. Immediately within the eastern outskirts of Clarksville, the fifth-largest city in Tennessee, the interstate reaches an interchange with State Route 48 (SR 48), less than  later, which provides access to Fort Campbell. About  later the interstate reaches US 79, which also provides access to Guthrie and Russellville in Kentucky to the northeast. Bypassing Clarksville to the east, the interstate next reaches SR 237. The highway then begins a steep descent, with the westbound lanes utilizing a truck climbing lane to ascend the grade from the east. It then crosses the Red River before reaching SR 76.

Leaving Clarksville, the highway enters a long straight section with several steep grades and crosses into Robertson County a short distance later. Several miles later, the interstate reaches an interchange with SR 49 near Pleasant View and Coopertown, which provides access to Springfield to the northeast and Ashland City to the southwest. The route then descends, utilizing another westbound truck lane, before briefly entering Cheatham County. The interstate then crosses another steep hill over the next several miles, utilizing an eastbound truck lane, before crossing into Davidson County. It then has an interchange with US 431 near the Joelton community, and begins a gradual descent into the Nashville Basin, containing a westbound truck lane. Passing over the next few miles through dense woodlands, the highway the highway reaches SR 45 (Old Hickory Boulevard) about  later. Over the next  beyond this point, the interstate crosses over another steep hill, utilizing truck lanes on both the eastbound and westbound ascent, before reaching Nashville at SR 155 (Briley Parkway).

Nashville metropolitan area 

Entering Nashville, I-24 has a cloverleaf interchange with SR-155 (Briley Parkway), a northern controlled-access beltway around Nashville. Less than  later, the interstate joins a concurrency with I-65, where the combined routes carry eight through lanes, and travel due south. About  later is an interchange with U.S. Route 41 Alternate (US 41A)/US 431 (Trinity Lane). About  beyond this point, I-65 splits off and I-24 passes along the east side of downtown Nashville, where it reduces to six lanes and has interchanges with US 41, US 431, and US 31E, and passes near Nissan Stadium. The interstate then crosses the Cumberland River on the Silliman Evans Bridge, and joins in a concurrency with I-40, travelling southeast-to-northwest with eight through lanes.  later, I-40 splits off eastwardly, heading toward Knoxville. Located at this interchange is also a partial interchange with US 41/US 70S.

Less than  later is an interchange with the eastern terminus of I-440, which is also accessible from I-40 nearby. Between I-40 and I-440, I-24's eastbound lanes are split into two barrier-separated carriageways to prevent weaving of traffic destined from I-40 to I-440. A short distance later is once again an interchange with SR 155 (Briley Parkway/Thompson Lane) near the Nashville International Airport. Beginning at the next exit, SR 255 (Harding Place), the left lanes operate as HOV lanes during rush hour. Over the next few miles, I-24 passes through the Antioch neighborhood, where it has interchanges with Haywood Lane and SR 254 (Bell Road), and crosses Mill Creek. I-24 then continues through southeast Nashville, reaching interchanges with Hickory Hollow Parkway and SR 171 (Old Hickory Boulevard).

Continuing through the southeastern suburbs of Nashville, I-24 crosses into Rutherford County about  beyond. Immediately within the city of LaVergne, the interstate has an exit with a connector road to that city. It then enters Smyrna where it first has an interchange with SR 266 (Sam Ridley Pkwy.). The interstate then enters a long straightaway, and reaches an interchange with SR 102 (Almaville Road), which also serves Smyrna and the Nissan Smyrna Assembly Plant. Leaving Smyrna, the route enters an unincorporated urban area, before reaching a three-level interchange with I-840, the outer southern beltway around Nashville. I-24 then enters Murfreesboro, the largest suburb of Nashville and sixth-largest city in Tennessee. The interstate first has an interchange with a local thoroughfare(Medical Center Parkway/Fortress Blvd), before reaching SR 96, which also connects to Franklin. A short distance later, the interstate crosses the west fork of the Stones River, and reaches SR 99 (New Salem Highway). A short distance later, the highway reaches US  231, which also connects to Lebanon and Shelbyville. Here, the HOV lane restriction terminates, and the interstate reduces from eight to four lanes. Leaving Murfreesboro, the interstate  later has an interchange with the Joe B. Jackson Parkway, which serves as an outer beltway around southeast Murfreesboro.

Eastern Nashville Basin and Eastern Highland Rim 

Upon leaving Murfreesboro, I-24 enters a rural area, passing through a mix of farmland and woodlands, and maintaining a straight alignment Several miles later, the interstate begins a gradual, largely unnoticeable, ascent out of the Nashville Basin onto the Eastern Highland Rim. A few miles later, the interstate briefly enters Bedford County, and then has an interchange with SR 64, which connects to Shelbyville, near the Bedford-Coffee County line. Upon reaching the top of the rim several miles later, the interstate has an interchange with US 41.  later, the highway enters Manchester, where it crosses the Little Duck River and then has interchanges with SR 53 and SR 55 in short proximity. A short distance later, the highway reaches an interchange with US 41 once again. The interstate then travels over the next  through a wide swath of mostly farmland, before entering Grundy County and reaching an interchange with US 64 and SR 50 near the town of Pelham, where it begins a concurrency with the former route that is largely unsigned. A short distance later, I-24 crosses the Elk River, before reaching the base of the Cumberland Plateau.

Monteagle Mountain and Cumberland Plateau gorge 

One of the most hazardous stretches of Interstate Highway in the United States is located where I-24 crosses the Cumberland Plateau on steep grades in Grundy and Marion County near the town of Monteagle, and is commonly known as "Monteagle Mountain" or "Monteagle". While all motorists are advised to exercise caution along this stretch, truckers are particularly vexed by Monteagle, and many have died in accidents along this stretch. The eastbound grade is particularly hazardous, with a protracted 4–6% grade over several miles. On this stretch, I-24 is three lanes in each direction, and contains two runaway truck ramps. Owing to geography, these two ramps are on the left side of the grade. The westbound downgrade of the plateau is also extremely hazardous and contains several sharp curves. Portions of this downgrade also feature offramp approach style lane dividers in order to slow motorists. At top of the Plateau, the interstate surpasses  in elevation, has interchanges with US 41A and US 41, respectively, and crosses into East Tennessee at the Grundy-Marion County line.

The eastern Monteagle grade also has one of the three widest medians of any Interstate Highway; the others are I-8 through the In-Ko-Pah grade in California and I-84 through the Cabbage Hill grade east of Pendleton, Oregon. The eastbound lanes descend the hill on one side of Monteagle Mountain as part of the original three-lane (two ascending, one descending) US 64 alignment, while the westbound lanes ascend the other side of the hill on new roadbed built for that purpose.

After descending Monteagle, I-24 travels for several miles through a vast flat gorge within the plateau characterized by long straightaways and few curves before reaching an interchange with US 72 near Kimball and South Pittsburg, where US 64 splits off. This exit is the primary means of access to Huntsville, Alabama, for motorists in East Tennessee. About  later, the interstate has an interchange with SR 28 in Jasper, and crosses the Sequatchie River. The route then crosses a large mountain ridge, has an interchange with SR 27, and, about  later, crosses the Nickajack Lake impoundment of the Tennessee River. Beyond this point, the highway travels through a narrow gorge over several miles, crossing the Running Water Creek and traveling under its namesake trestle. This stretch is extremely crooked, and can experience potentially strong crosswind. The interstate then enters Hamilton County and Eastern Time Zone, and then crosses into Georgia less than  later.

Georgia and Chattanooga 

Along this stretch, exits remain numbered according to Tennessee's mileage; however, the roadway mileposts are numbered according to Georgia's mileage. This segment also carries the unsigned SR 409 designation for internal Georgia Department of Transportation (GDOT) purposes. About  after entering the state, the interstate has an interchange with the northern terminus of I-59, which provides access to Birmingham, Alabama, to the south. The route then shifts north, and has an interchange with Georgia State Route 299 (SR 299) in Wildwood about  later before turning back north and reentering Tennessee about  later.

Upon reentering Tennessee and Hamilton County, I-24 travels through Lookout Valley for several miles, and has an interchange with US 11/US 41/US 72 (Lee Highway) about  later near the Tiftonia neighborhood. About  later, the interstate curves sharply to the east, traveling on a narrow artificial causeway between the Tennessee River to the north and the northern tip of Lookout Mountain to the south. A short distance later, the interstate gradually curves 90 degrees to the north, entering Chattanooga. Less than  later is a three-way interchange with US 27 (unsigned I-124 northbound) northbound, which provides access to downtown Chattanooga directly to the north. Forming an unsigned concurrency with US 27, the highways sharply curve 90 degrees to the east, before widening to eight lanes. I-24 then briefly dips to the south, where it has a trumpet interchange with a connector to SR 8. A short distance later, US 27 splits off to the south at a near-cloverleaf interchange as Rossville Boulevard, where the interstate reduces to six lanes. It then travels through the south side of Chattanooga before reaching a partial interchange with US 41/US 76. Here I-24 reaches the "Ridge Cut", a  stretch where the interstate ascends Missionary Ridge on a steep grade, first curving sharply to the north at the bottom of the ascent and then to the east again at the top. This stretch is notorious for severe congestion, and is especially hazardous to truckers. At the top of the Ridge Cut, the interstate enters a straight section and begins a gradual descent over a short distance. Traveling roughly along the boundary between Chattanooga and East Ridge, the interstate has interchanges with multiple local thoroughfares over the next several miles. It then reaches its eastern terminus with I-75 at a directional-T interchange, known locally as the "I-75/24 Split" or simply "The Split".

History

Planning
The stretch of I-24 between Nashville and Chattanooga was authorized by the Federal Aid Highway Act of 1956, commonly known as the Interstate Highway Act. The numbering was approved by the American Association of State Highway Transportation Officials (AASHTO) on August 14, 1957.

In 1957, officials in Tennessee, Kentucky, Illinois, and Missouri began an effort to extend I-24 west of its allocated western terminus in Nashville to St. Louis; however, each of the states had difficulty reaching an agreement on the proposed routing. Eventually, the debate evolved into two proposed alignments for the extension in Tennessee. This latter alignment was favored by many officials in Tennessee and Western Kentucky, but the federal government preferred the former, due to its proximitiy to Fort Campbell.

On September 17, 1963, the governors of the four states in a meeting with President John F. Kennedy reached an agreement on the alignment, which included the Nashville-to-Clarksville alignment in Tennessee and extended the route's western terminus to Pulleys Mill, Illinois. The four governors also urged the approval of a new east–west interstate highway to run between Hayti, Missouri and Jackson, Tennessee, incorporating a then-unbuilt bridge across the Mississippi River that had been proposed since the early 1940s. On August 18, 1964, the Bureau of Public Roads, the predecessor agency to the Federal Highway Administration, approved the I-24 extension; however, they only authorized the westernmost  of the route between Missouri and Tennessee, which was designated as I-155 and terminates in Dyersburg, Tennessee.

Initial construction 
The first contract for the construction of I-24 in Tennessee was awarded on September 18, 1957, for a short segment in Chattanooga. The interchange with I-75, along with the segment of I-75 extending to the Georgia state line were contracted in July 1959 and dedicated on May 31, 1961. The first major section to be completed was the western ascent of Monteagle Mountain, which stretched from US 64 near Pelham to US 41 in Monteagle, and eliminated a stretch of US 41 with several hazardous hairpin curves. Work began in September 1958, and the stretch opened to traffic on February 6, 1962. The short segment in Chattanooga between Belvoir Avenue and I-75 opened in late October 1962. In Nashville a short segment of the concurrent segment with I-40, located between Fesslers Lane and the eastern interchange with that route, was declared complete on January 11, 1965. The section between the southern interchange with I-65 (then I-265) and Fesslers Lane was partially opened in late December 1963, and fully opened on April 19, 1965. The Silliman Evans Bridge along this stretch was dedicated on January 14, 1964. On July 27, 1965, the short section between the southern interchange with I-65 (then I-265) and US 431 (Trinity Lane) was opened. The Ridge Cut section in Chattanooga, which spanned between Fourth Avenue and Germantown Road, was dedicated on December 1, 1965.

To construct the segment at the foot of Lookout Mountain west of downtown Chattanooga, engineers shifted the river channel to the north in order to avoid impeding the flow. This was accomplished by dredging out the north bank, and filling in along the south bank with approximately 250,000 tons of rock from a nearby quarry. This stretch of I-24, which spanned from US 41 in Lookout Valley to 23rd Street near downtown Chattanooga, was completed on December 16, 1966, at a cost of approximately $15 million (equivalent to $ in ), making it one of the most expensive highway projects, per mile, at the time. I-24 was complete in Marion County to Monteagle Mountain in late 1966 and between US 41 in Manchester and US 64 near Pelham on July 27, 1967. The short segment between SR 27 and SR 156 in Marion County, including the bridge over Nickajack Lake, opened on December 18, 1967.

In Nashville, the short section between US 431 and the northern interchange with I-65, along with a short stretch of I-65 north of this section, opened to traffic on December 23, 1968. On December 9, 1970, I-24 opened between US 231 in Murfreesboro and SR 64 near Beechgrove. The route was opened between SR 171 in Nashville and US 231 in Murfreesboro on December 31, 1970. The last segment of I-24 between Nashville and Chattanooga, the segment located between SR 64 near Beechgrove and US 41 northwest of Manchester, was opened and dedicated on December 16, 1971.

Western extension 
Work began on I-24 from the Kentucky line through Clarksville in 1970, and construction on the entirety of I-24 between Clarksville and Nashville was underway by 1972, with an estimated completion date of late 1974 or early 1975. Construction on this approximately  segment, the last segment of mainline Interstate Highway completed in Tennessee, proved to be difficult due to the rugged and hilly terrain. The approximately  segment between US 68 in Hopkinsville, Kentucky, and US 79 in Clarksville, Tennessee, was jointly opened to traffic by both states on September 12, 1975. The  section between US 79 and SR 49 in Robertson County was completed in September 1976. The last segment of I-24 in Tennessee, between SR 49 and I-65 in Nashville, was opened to traffic on January 5, 1978, more than two years behind schedule.

A groundbreaking ceremony for the first stretch of I-24 in Kentucky was held on December 6, 1967, in Lyon County. The section of I-24 in Illinois was authorized for engineering by 1966 and authorized for construction by 1968. The first section of I-24 in Illinois, located between US 45 in Vienna and US 45 in Metropolis, was dedicated and opened by then-Governor Dan Walker on January 15, 1974. On October 18, 1974, the stretch between US 45 in Metropolis and US 60 in Paducah, including the Ohio River bridge, opened to traffic. This was also the first stretch of I-24 to open in Kentucky. The final segment of I-24 in Illinois, located between I-57 and US 45 in Vienna, was dedicated and opened to traffic by Governor Walker on January 24, 1976. In October 1977, the stretch between US 68 in Reidland and US 62 east of Calvert City was completed.

The  section between US 62 near Calvert City and Route 453, including the Tennessee River Bridge, which had been completed approximately five years prior, was opened to traffic on October 25, 1979. The section between US 60 in Paducah and US 68 in Reidland was opened and dedicated by then-governor Julian Carroll on December 15, 1978. The stretch between US 62  On December 10, 1979, the stretch between Route 453 and US 60/641 in Eddyville, including the Cumberland River Bridge, was opened. Construction on the bridge began in 1972, but issues caused by unusual rock formations at the site, believed to have been formed by the 1811–1812 New Madrid earthquakes or earlier quakes, delayed completion and resulted in the cost nearly tripling. On March 20, 1980, the  stretch in Eddyville between US 62/641 and the Western Kentucky Parkway (now I-69), along with the westernmost  of the latter route, was opened. I-24 was completed when the  section opened to traffic from what is now I-69 to US 68 east of Cadiz on May 23, 1980.

Major projects and expansions

Monteagle Mountain reconstruction 
A project began in April 1985 that extensively straightened and rebuilt the eastbound lanes of I-24 on the eastern downgrade of Monteagle Mountain, and reduced the grade. The project also added left shoulders and an additional runaway truck ramp, the latter of which was not originally planned. This work was completed in 1989, and the lanes were reopened on July 11 of that year in a ceremony officiated by then-governor Ned McWherter. The project experienced many setbacks including geological problems, which caused extensive delays. Originally targeted for completion in December 1987 at a cost of $17 million (equivalent to $ in ), the final cost was $29.5 million (equivalent to $ in ). During this project both directions of traffic were routed to the westbound lanes of I-24, which were separated by a jersey barrier, and a temporary runaway truck ramp for eastbound traffic was also provided along this alignment. A truck station to allow for the adjustment of brakes opened in January 1992. After the safety improvements were completed, accidents in the eastbound lanes of this stretch dropped from 54 in 1983 to 3 in 1991.

Nashville 
The Silliman Evans Bridge was widened from six to eight lanes in a project that completely closed the northbound span between January 20, 1974, and April 6, 1975, and the southbound span from April 6, 1975, to November 16, 1975. This project also added shoulders to the bridge and removed railings that had been deemed unsafe and were believed to have played a role in multiple fatal accidents on the bridge.

In November 1977, TDOT installed a system to detect tailgating vehicles in the westbound lanes of the concurrent segment with I-40, which consisted of sensors embedded in the roadway connected to overhead warning signs with flashing lights and horns. The system was the first of its kind in the country, but experienced technical problems and was criticized as ineffective, leading to its decommission in July 1980.

The  stretch between near SR 255 (Harding Place) and near SR 254 (Bell Road) was widened to six lanes between April 1989 and November 1990. Between November 1994 and November 1995, TDOT made safety modifications to I-24 through the eastern terminus with I-440 and the nearby split with I-40, which reconfigured the routes to provide direct access to I-440 westbound from I-40 westbound, splitting I-24's eastbound lanes into two barrier-separated carriageways.

The approximately  segment between Haywood Lane in Nashville and SR 266 in Smyrna was widened from four to eight lanes between June 1997 and December 1998, installing the first HOV lanes on I-24. The  portion between SR 266 and I-840 was widened from four to eight lanes between August 1998 and November 2000. The  segment between I-440 and Haywood Lane was widened from three to four lanes in each direction between March 2000 and May 2002 in a project that also improved the interchanges on this segment. Widening of the segment between I-840 and SR 96 began in early 2004 and was completed in the summer of 2005. This project added a new interchange at Medical Center Parkway. A project that widened I-24 from four to eight lanes between SR 96 and US 231, and also added a new interchange with SR 99, began in April 2006 and was completed on January 28, 2008.

Chattanooga 
In Chattanooga, the stretch between the bottom of the Ridge Cut and east of the Big Scramble was widened from four to six lanes in the mid to latter 1980s. Between May 1989 and November 1991, the Big Scramble was modified in a project that eliminated left-hand entrance and exit ramps, widened parts of the main carriageway, and converted the westbound lanes of I-24 into the ramp carrying I-24 westbound traffic to US 27 northbound.

The original interchange with I-75, which was a simple directional-T design, had repeatedly been ranked as one of the top ten worst freight bottlenecks in the United States by the American Transportation Research Institute, and contained several sharp curves and other safety hazards. In December 2018, a contract was awarded to rebuild the interchange, with preliminary work beginning in May 2019. The project consisted of eliminating left-hand entrance and exit ramps from I-75 onto I-24, straightening curves, widening I-75 to six lanes through the interchange, widening two ramps from I-75 to I-24 to three lanes, replacing two overpass bridges, and construction of a collector-distributor facility that carries traffic directly from US 41 and the Tennessee Welcome Center along I-75 northbound, providing direct access to both I-75 northbound and I-24 westbound. Additional space was also provided to widen the remaining ramps between I-75 and I-24 to three lanes, which will be done in the second phase. The project was completed on August 19, 2021, at a cost of $133.5 million, making it the second-most expensive individual contract in state history at the time. In preparation for the second phase, the Belvoir Avenue overpass and Germantown Road underpass were replaced between May 2020 and August 2021; the latter replacement utilized accelerated bridge construction by shifting I-24 traffic onto the Germantown Road entrance and exit ramp and adjacent frontage roads.

I-24 SMART Corridor 
The  stretch of I-24 between I-440 (Exit 53) in Nashville and US 231 (Exit 81) in Murfreesboro is currently in the process of being developed into the "I-24 SMART Corridor" in an effort to address congestion and mobility issues. In recent years this stretch of I-24 has become the most congested highway corridor in the state, due to the rapid growth of the region. The project pairs this stretch with the adjacent paralleling stretch of US 41/70S (Murfreesboro Road), and all connecting roads in between. The first phase, which ran from October 2018 to December 2021 included the construction of emergency pull-offs, improvements to multiple entrance and exit ramps, the erection of additional roadside dynamic message signs, and upgrades to traffic signals along the corridor. The second phase, which began in March 2022, includes the erection of 67 overhead gantries with signs between mileposts 53 and 70 that will display recommended variable speed limits and variable lane control signs for each lane. The final phase will include the installation of ramp meters on certain on-ramps and the installation of additional CCTV cameras and DMS boards and ADA improvements along connecting arterials.

Major incidents 
The accident was investigated by the National Transportation Safety Board (NTSB), which named a number of unsafe design features of the bridge as contributors to the crash. The report also concluded that the state had been aware of the safety hazards of the bridge's rails prior to the accident, which had played a role in previous fatal accidents on the bridge. This accident was cited as the primary event that led to the widening project on the bridge months later.

In 1979, structural problems were discovered on the Ohio River Bridge, including 119 cracks as a result of defective welding in the tie girders. The bridge was closed on August 3, 1979, and remained closed to all traffic through October 1980 and all truck traffic until the summer of 1981.

On May 18, 2010, it was announced that a sinkhole was found in the eastbound lanes of I-24 in Grundy County near the exit to US 64/SR 50 (exit 127). TDOT officials stated that the hole was growing and diverted traffic onto the westbound lanes. Following emergency repairs, the highway was reopened several days later.

Future 
TDOT and GDOT are jointly making preparations to widen the  stretch of I-24 from I-59 to US 27 in Chattanooga to six lanes. This project is expected to be split into three phases, due to its location within two states and the difficulties of expanding the stretch which is located on a narrow artificial causeway between Lookout Mountain and the Tennessee River. This stretch has long experienced severe congestion issues, and is considered a major bottleneck, particularly for trucks.

Other stretches of I-24 planned to be widened in the near future include the stretch through Clarksville, the stretch between SR 45 and I-65 northwest of Nashville, and the eastern leg of the downtown loop in Nashville between I-65 and I-40.

Exit list

Related routes

Interstate 124 

Interstate 124 (I-124) is an unsigned designation for a short segment of a four-lane controlled-access highway located in Chattanooga, Tennessee. During periods where this  segment of U.S. Route 27 (US 27) has been signed as I-124, it has served as a spur route of I-24 to downtown Chattanooga. The road segment has not been signed as I-124 since the late 1980s (it is marked on overhead signs and milemarkers as US 27), and the Tennessee Department of Transportation official map no longer designates it as I-124, but some DOT publications still make reference to the designation.

Paducah business loop 

Interstate 24 Business Loop (I-24 Bus.) is an  business loop of I-24 that travels through downtown Paducah, Kentucky, that begins at I-24 and US 60 at exit 4 and ends at I-24 and Kentucky Route 1954 (KY 1954) at exit 11. Originally designated as the I-24 Downtown Loop (I-24 Dwtn.), the route was repurposed as I-24 Bus. in 2002. The highway follows US 60, Business U.S. Route 60 (Bus. US 60), and KY 1954.

Major Intersections

See also

References

External links 

Illinois Highway Ends: Interstate 24
Official State of Tennessee Road Map

Interstate 24
24
24
Transportation in Williamson County, Illinois
Transportation in Johnson County, Illinois
Transportation in Massac County, Illinois
Transportation in McCracken County, Kentucky
Transportation in Marshall County, Kentucky
Transportation in Livingston County, Kentucky
Transportation in Lyon County, Kentucky
Transportation in Caldwell County, Kentucky
Transportation in Trigg County, Kentucky
Transportation in Christian County, Kentucky
Transportation in Montgomery County, Tennessee
Transportation in Robertson County, Tennessee
Transportation in Cheatham County, Tennessee
Transportation in Davidson County, Tennessee
Transportation in Rutherford County, Tennessee
Transportation in Bedford County, Tennessee
Transportation in Coffee County, Tennessee
Transportation in Grundy County, Tennessee
Transportation in Marion County, Tennessee
Transportation in Hamilton County, Tennessee
Transportation in Dade County, Georgia
24
24
24